CINN-FM is a Canadian radio station, broadcasting at 91.1 FM in Hearst, Ontario.

Owned and operated by Radio de l'Épinette Noire cooperative, it is a non-profit community radio station for the region's franco-ontarian community. CINN-FM began broadcasting in 1988.

The station is a member of the Alliance des radios communautaires du Canada.

External links
 www.cinnfm.com
 
 Decision CRTC 87-847

Inn
Inn
Inn
Radio stations established in 1988
1988 establishments in Ontario